This article is a list of events in the year 2004 in Senegal.

Incumbents
 President: Abdoulaye Wade
 Prime Minister: Idrissa Seck (until April 21), Macky Sall (from April 21)

Events

December
 December 30 - President Wade signs a peace accord with rebels in the Casamance region after 22 years of war.

Sports
January: the 2004 Dakar Rally took place, finishing in Dakar
ASC Diaraf won the Senegal Premier League football championship

References

 
2000s in Senegal
Years of the 21st century in Senegal
Senegal
Senegal